Oddball, Oddballs, or Odd Ball may refer to:

 Odd Ball (comic strip), a British comic strip
 Oddball (character), Marvel supervillain
 Oddball (film), a 2015 Australian film
 Oddballs, a British comedy troupe
 Oddballs (album), 2000 album by Frank Black
 Oddballs (company), a clothing company
 Oddballs (TV series), an animated comedy streaming television series by James Rallison and Ethan Banville
 Odd Balls, 2004 comedy album by The Bob & Tom Show
 Oddball (102 Dalmatians), a spotless dalmatian puppy in the film 102 Dalmatians
 Oddball (dragline excavator), a dragline excavator in St Aidan's, West Yorkshire, England
 Oddball, eccentric tank commander played by Donald Sutherland in the film Kelly's Heroes
 Oddballs, 1993 collection of short stories by children's author William Sleator
 Oddball, a segment on the MSNBC show Countdown with Keith Olbermann
 Oddball, a type of trivia question featured in the boardgame Brain Chain

See also
 Oddball paradigm, a neuroscientific experimental design paradigm
 Unidentified Flying Oddball, 1979 film adaptation of A Connecticut Yankee in King Arthur’s Court